Corey Burton (born August 3, 1955) is an American voice actor. He is the current voice of Captain Hook, Ludwig Von Drake and others for The Walt Disney Company, Shockwave on The Transformers, Brainiac in the DC Animated Universe, Count Dooku and Cad Bane in the Star Wars franchise, Zeus in the God of War series and Hugo Strange in Batman: Arkham City.

Career

Early career
Burton started his career at age 17 under the stage name Corey Weinman, with an imitation performance of Hans Conried for Disney. He studied radio acting with Daws Butler for four years and went on to work with nearly all of the original Hollywood radio actors in classic-style radio dramas. He was unsure at first about pursuing voice-work, due to his shy demeanor and Autism Spectrum Disorder, but credits the diverse world and character design of Disney's The Haunted Mansion attraction as his inspiration to move forward.

Disney
Burton has done extensive voice-work for Disney, including animated features and theme park attractions at the Disneyland Resort, Walt Disney World, and Tokyo Disney Resort. He provides the "Feature Presentation" voice on direct-to-video video releases and can be heard as the narration voice at Disneyland. He provided the voice of Captain Hook in Disney's Return to Never Land and dubbed the voice of Deems Taylor in Fantasia for the film's 2000 and 2010 re-releases.

Burton has voiced sound-alikes and original characters for over 50 Disney Storyteller records. His roles include:
 Ludwig Von Drake in DuckTales and its 2017 reboot.
 Dale and Zipper in Chip 'n Dale Rescue Rangers.
 The White Rabbit and Mad Hatter in Disney's House of Mouse.
 Gruffi Gummi and Toadwart in Disney's Adventures of the Gummi Bears (following the death of Bill Scott).
 Zeus in Disney's Hercules: The Animated Series (replacing Rip Torn).
 Quint and Speedy the Snail in Timon & Pumbaa.
 Gaëtan "Mole" Molière in Atlantis: The Lost Empire and Atlantis: Milo's Return.
 Ansem the Wise  in the Kingdom Hearts series.
 Professor Owl in the Disney Sing-Along Songs series.
 King Stefan in Disney Princess Enchanted Tales: Follow Your Dreams.
 Buzz Lightyear in the Disney on Ice adaptation of Toy Story 3.
 Yen Sid and Captain Hook in the Epic Mickey and Kingdom Hearts series.
 Doc Hudson in various Cars media and Radiator Springs Racers (replacing Paul Newman).
 General Knowledge from the former Cranium Command attraction at Epcot.
 Dale, Bruno Biggs, and Moe Whiplash from Walt Disney World Quest: Magical Racing Tour.

Paul Frees
Burton, for many years, served as a protégé to voice actor Paul Frees. Following Frees' death and his son Fred's temporary takeover, Burton stepped in and imitated Frees' voice as the Ghost Host in Disneyland's Haunted Mansion Holiday attraction. He also recited the classic line "Welcome, foolish mortals" in the opening of the 2003 film adoption and currently serves as the Ghost Host's voice in every Haunted Mansion franchise-related media, adoptions, and events.

He was approached to record a new safety spiel for the intro to the original Haunted Mansion ride. He declined and the spiel was instead recorded by voice actor Joe Leahy.

He provides many others Paul Frees-like voices for Disneyland Park, including several newer pirates in the Pirates of the Caribbean attraction (like the "Pooped Pirate" and the pirate voice that guides you on and off the boat), Grumpy on the Seven Dwarfs Mine Train attraction, and several voices in Mr. Toad's Wild Ride.

He performed another Frees imitation for comedian Stan Freberg's album Stan Freberg Presents The United States of America, Volume Two.

He performed a Frees imitation as the voice of the announcer in the 1999 film Dudley Do-Right and did likewise as the voices of the alien foreheads in Larry Blamire's 2008 satire Trail of the Screaming Forehead.

Fantasia
In the 60th Anniversary Edition and the 2010 special edition of Disney's Fantasia, Burton re-recorded all of Deems Taylor's commentaries.

Transformers
Burton appeared as Shockwave, Sunstreaker, Brawn, and Spike Witwicky in the original Transformers animated series by Sunbow Productions and Marvel Productions. He would later voice Megatron, Ratchet, Ironhide, Brawn, Cyrus "The Colossus" Rhodes, Spike Witwicky, and Longarm Prime / Shockwave in Transformers: Animated by Cartoon Network.

Burton stated in an interview that Shockwave was by far his favorite character to perform in the original series. Despite this, he turned down the offer to reprise the role in Transformers: Dark of the Moon, as he felt he had voiced the character enough times. Consequently, the part was given to Frank Welker, the voice of Megatron / Galvatron.

Star Wars
For Star Wars, Burton voiced Count Dooku, Cad Bane, and Ziro, the Hutt in Star Wars: The Clone Wars, and has continued to voice Cad Bane in Star Wars: The Bad Batch and The Book of Boba Fett. He has also voiced several characters in video games.

Kingdom Hearts
For the Kingdom Hearts series, Burton voiced Ansem the Wise in Chain of Memories, Birth by Sleep, and Dream Drop Distance due to Christopher Lee's health problems. For the cinematic version of Kingdom Hearts 358/2 Days, he re-dubbed Lee's lines for the Nintendo DS version. He reprised his role as Ansem the Wise for Kingdom Hearts III.

Brainiac
Burton has portrayed the supervillain Brainiac in the DC animated universe. He appeared as the character in Superman: The Animated Series, Justice League, Static Shock, and Justice League Unlimited. Although not set within the DCAU, he also reprised his role in Legion of Super Heroes, DC Universe Online, and Lego DC Super-Villains.

Highlights
 Narrated the 1992 Discovery Channel documentary Great White!.
 Scarecrow, Ronald Marshall and Yuri Dimitrov in Batman: Gotham Knight.
 V.V. Argost and Leonidas Van Rook in The Secret Saturdays.
 The titular character in James Bond Jr..
 The Pupununu in Tak and the Power of Juju.
 Invisibo in Freakazoid!.
 Old Queeks in Mike, Lu & Og.
 Captain Marvel in Superman/Batman: Public Enemies.
 Red Tornado, Silver Cyclone, Doctor Mid-Nite, Will Magnus, Joker (Scooby-Doo version), Mercury, and Thomas Wayne in Batman: The Brave and the Bold.
 Count Dooku, Cad Bane, and Ziro the Hutt in Star Wars: The Clone Wars.
 Tomax in G.I. Joe.
 Goon, Kanawk, and Tauron in Robotix.
 Law in G.I. Joe: Renegades.
 Brain, Dudley H. Dudley, Hamilton Hill, James Gordon, and Wizard in Young Justice.
 Dash Whippet for Pound Puppies.
 Brainstorm, Malware, and Mr. Baumann in Ben 10: Omniverse.
 Dracula in Avengers Assemble, and Ultimate Spider-Man.
 Ranger Smith in Boo Boo Runs Wild, and A Day in the Life of Ranger Smith.

Other work
 Played Jerry Lyden in the radio series Alien Worlds.
 Has done work for the Universal Studios theme parks.
 Does voice-overs for Old Navy commercials and a promo for Final Fantasy XII.
 Provided voice-overs for WWE's WrestleMania XXV recap segments.
 Various characters in the 1980 cult classic Closet Cases of the Nerd Kind.
 The titular creatures in the Critters film series.
 Narrator for the video game Brütal Legend.
 Volteer the Electric Guardian Dragon, Exhumor, and Mason in The Legend of Spyro trilogy.
 Zeus in the God of War series.
 Numerous supporting roles on Focus on the Family's radio drama Adventures in Odyssey.
 Doctor N. Gin, Doctor Nefarious Tropy and Nitros Oxide in the Crash Bandicoot series.
 Jack in the theme park attraction The House at Haunted Hill.
 Narrator of the film The A-Team.
 Hugo Strange in Batman: Arkham City and Lego DC Super-Villains.
 John Grey (Jean Grey's father) for Wolverine and the X-Men.
 Provided voice samples for the song "Machete" by DJ Hazard and the album Universus by ShockOne.
 Game Narrator for Disney Coaster.
 Announcer for the Bounty Law promo in Once Upon a Time in Hollywood.
 Announcer for the El Rey Network.
 Played the Narrator and the Guest in Flying Logos.
 Still heard on the safety info for the parking lot trams for Disneyland and Magic Kingdom (as of 2011).

Filmography

Film

Television

Video games

Theme parks
 Alice in Wonderland – White Rabbit, Playing Cards
 Cranium Command – General Knowledge, Chicken
 Dudley Do-Right's Ripsaw Falls – Snidely Whiplash, Narrator
 Fantasmic! – Chernabog, Captain Hook, Magic Mirror, Pirates
 Haunted Mansion Holiday – Ghost Host* Horizons – Futureport "Brava Centauri" Announcer
 Journey Into Your Imagination – Figment
 Mickey and Friends Parking Tram – Spiel
 Mr. Toad's Wild Ride – Cop, Judge, Farmer
 O Canada! – Invisible Narrator (2007–19)
 Parking Lot Trams – Safety Spiel
 Peter Pan's Flight – Captain Hook, Mr. Smee
 Pirates of the Caribbean – Stuffed Pirate, Safety Spiel
 Radiator Springs Racers – Doc Hudson
 Seven Dwarfs Mine Train – Grumpy
 Tapestry of Nations – Sage of Time
 The Cat in the Hat – Fish
 Walt Disney World Railroad – Conductor Spiel (2022–present)
 Wonders of Life – Narrator

Awards and nominations

References

External links
 
 
 
 

Living people
20th-century American male actors
21st-century American male actors
American male radio actors
American male video game actors
American male voice actors
American people of Jewish descent
Annie Award winners
Audiobook narrators
Disney people
Male actors from California
People with Asperger syndrome
Actors with autism
1955 births